(French for Girls of Kilimanjaro) is a studio album by American jazz trumpeter Miles Davis. It was recorded in June and September 1968, and released on Columbia Records. It was released in the United Kingdom by the company's subsidiary Columbia (CBS) in 1968 and in the United States during February 1969. The album is a transitional work for Davis, who was shifting stylistically from acoustic recordings with his "second great quintet" to his electric period. Filles de Kilimanjaro was well received by contemporary music critics, who viewed it as a significant release in modern jazz. Pianist Chick Corea and bassist Dave Holland appear together on two tracks, their first participation on a Davis album.

Background 
The June sessions featured Wayne Shorter on tenor saxophone, Herbie Hancock on the electric Rhodes piano, Ron Carter on electric bass guitar, and Tony Williams on drums.  The September sessions replaced Hancock with Corea, and Carter with Holland, making Filles de Kilimanjaro the last Miles album to feature his “Second Great Quintet”, although all except Carter would play on his next album, In A Silent Way. During the September sessions, Holland played acoustic double bass and Corea played an RMI Electra-piano in addition to acoustic piano. These are Holland and Corea's first known recordings with Davis. The album was produced by Teo Macero and engineered by Frank Laico and Arthur Kendy. Shortly after the sessions for Filles de Kilimanjaro, Davis led further sessions in November 1968 with additional personnel including Joe Zawinul (organ) and Jack DeJohnette (drums); however, these recordings were scrapped for several years until being released on compilations throughout the 1970s and 1980s. All of these, plus the September recordings from Filles de Kilimanjaro, were eventually included on The Complete In a Silent Way Sessions box set in 2001.

The album title refers, in part, to Kilimanjaro African Coffee, a company in which Davis had made a financial investment.  Davis decided to list all the song titles in French to give the album an exotic touch. Davis married Betty O. Mabry Davis in September 1968, and named " (Miss Mabry)" for her. The song itself was recorded during the same month as Davis's wedding and Betty appears on the album cover.

Composition and performance 

The album can be seen as a transitional work between Davis's mainly acoustic recordings with the Second Quintet and his later electric period (for example, Bitches Brew). It is suffused in the heady abstraction of the 1960s, but attentive to blues tonalities, electronic textures, and dancing rhythms of later jazz fusion. Davis apparently saw it as a transitional work for him, as the album was the first in what would become a series of his releases to bear the subtitle "Directions in music by Miles Davis". However, author Paul Tingen points out that while Carter and Hancock played electric instruments at the first recording session, the later session was a bit of a throwback, in which Holland played only acoustic bass and Corea played both acoustic and electric piano. Noted linguist and Miles Davis-biographer Jack Chambers later wrote that the band sought to expand beyond their usual minimal structure and find a common mood, wanting listeners to "discover the unity of the pieces instead of just locating it, as viewers must discover the unity in a painting with several simultaneous perspectives".

The melodic complexity of "Petits Machins (Little Stuff)" highlights Davis's interest in departing from post-bop structure towards the sounds and textures of his subsequent fusion work. Music writer Marcus Singletary commented on its complexity, "True to the general concept of Filles de Kilimanjaro, a mosaic of controlled chaos becomes the defining sound of 'Little Stuff'". On the recording, the quintet expresses an  meter with a repeating riff and chromatically ascending dominant harmonies in the recording first section. Section two moves to a contrasting 10-bar section in  meter, with the opening six bars relying on an F pedal point in the bass, above which occur shifting harmonies each measure. The static F pedal section yields to a syncopated progression with meters seven to eight and a change of bass in meters nine to 10, as the quintet makes an alteration to section two during the improvisations. Music theorist Keith Waters cites this as an example of "Davis's—by now—well-worn practice of metric deletion", in which throughout the trumpet solo, the quintet maintains a repeated nine-bar cycle, rather than the 10 bars of section two heard during the first section. The quintet omits bar 10 of section two during the solos and maintains the harmonic progression of bars 1 through 9. As in the first section, the syncopated progression occurs in bar 7, but Carter does not participate in playing the syncopation of meters seven to eight during the improvisations, while Hancock interprets this progression more freely. Singletary said of its musical significance:

As with the album's title track, the quintet does not return to the first section and the recording concludes with a second Davis improvisation.

Gil Evans, with whom Davis had previously collaborated, helped compose, arrange, and produce the album, though he is not mentioned in the credits. Evans co-composed "", which he later recorded as "Eleven" with himself and Davis listed as co-composers.  The song " (Miss Mabry)", while credited to Davis, is actually Gil Evans' reworking of "The Wind Cries Mary" by Jimi Hendrix (Davis and Evans had met with Hendrix several times to exchange ideas). At the same time, some portions of the song resemble Mann, Weil, Leiber and Stoller's "On Broadway".

Critical reception 

In a contemporary review, Rolling Stone claimed that "no amount of track-by-track description here can begin to convey the beauty and intensity. There are five songs, but really they fit together as five expressions of the same basic piece, one sustained work". Stanley Crouch, a staunch critic of Davis's use of electric instruments, described the album as "the trumpeter's last important jazz record". In a retrospective review of the album, Uncut called it "a masterpiece of tropical exoticism". Sputnikmusic staff writer Tyler Fisher commented that the rhythm section-players "sound entirely innovative and fresh" and "The whole band, in both quintets, has an extreme awareness about each other and knows exactly where each soloist is going". He attributed its "more avant-garde feel" to a "lack of form and the constant outlook of many measures ahead", while calling it "a full out enjoyable listen, showcasing enough variety and virtuosity to not make the 70-minute album a tiring listen". AllMusic editor Stephen Thomas Erlewine called its music "unpretentiously adventurous, grounded in driving, mildly funky rhythms and bluesy growls from Miles, graced with weird, colorful flourishes from the band [...] Where Miles in the Sky meandered a bit, this is considerably more focused", dubbing it as "the swan song for his second classic quintet, arguably the finest collective of musicians he ever worked with". Erlewine also cited the album as "the beginning of a new phase for Miles, the place that he begins to dive headfirst into jazz-rock fusion", and commented on its significance in Davis's catalogue:

Down Beat critic John Ephland called Filles de Kilimanjaro "the stylistic precursor to the ever-popular In a Silent Way of 1969", writing that "Filles is performed (and edited) like a suite, with a sense of flow unlike anything Davis had recorded up to that point. That flow is enhanced by a music played all in one key (F), with only five 'tunes,' and with a mood and rhythms that change gradually from start to finish". Ephland concluded in his review, "In passing, Filles de Kilimanjaro is a turning-point album unlike any other for Davis: For the first time, his bebop roots were essentially severed, rockier rhythms, electricity and ostinato-driven bass lines now holding sway". Jim Santella from All About Jazz wrote that the album's music "flows with a lyricism that remains highly regarded in today’s format", concluding in his review that "Filles De Kilimanjaro remains one of the classic albums from their collaboration, and represents a high point in modern jazz".

Track listing
All songs were credited to Miles Davis.

Personnel
Miles Davis – trumpet
Wayne Shorter – tenor saxophone
Herbie Hancock – electric piano 
Chick Corea – piano, RMI electra-piano 
Ron Carter – electric bass 
Dave Holland – double bass 
Tony Williams – drums

Production personnel
Teo Macero – production
Frank Laico, Arthur Kendy – engineering
Hiro – cover art

References

Bibliography

External links 
 Filles de Kilimanjaro at Discogs

1969 albums
Miles Davis albums
Columbia Records albums
Albums produced by Teo Macero
Albums recorded at CBS 30th Street Studio
Jazz fusion albums by American artists
Legacy Recordings albums
Post-bop albums